is a Japanese politician, an independent and member of the House of Councillors in the Diet (national legislature). A native of Hiroshima Prefecture and graduate of Kobe Gakuin University, he was elected to the House of Councillors for the first time in 2007 after working as a newsreader from 1992 to 2006.

In October 2017, he came out as gay.

References

External links 
  in Japanese.

Members of the House of Councillors (Japan)
1969 births
Living people
Gay politicians
Japanese LGBT politicians
21st-century LGBT people